I'm a Stranger Here Myself may refer to:

 I'm a Stranger Here Myself (1938), a book by Ogden Nash
 "I'm a Stranger Here Myself" (1943), a song from the musical One Touch of Venus
 "I'm a Stranger Here Myself" (1951), a short story by science fiction author Mack Reynolds
 I'm a Stranger Here Myself: The Story of a Welsh Farm (1978), a novel by John Seymour
 I'm a Stranger Here Myself: Notes on Returning to America After 20 Years Away (1998), a book by travel writer Bill Bryson
 Sorry, I'm a Stranger Here Myself (1981–1982), a British sitcom